Roy Anthony Hargrove (October 16, 1969 – November 2, 2018) was an American jazz musician and composer whose principal instruments were the trumpet and flugelhorn. He achieved worldwide acclaim after winning two Grammy Awards for differing styles of jazz in 1998 and 2002. Hargrove primarily played in the hard bop style for the majority of his albums, but also had a penchant for genre-crossing exploration and collaboration with a variety of hip hop, soul, R&B and alternative rock artists.  As Hargrove told one reporter, "I've been around all kinds of musicians, and if a cat can play, a cat can play. If it's gospel, funk, R&B, jazz or hip-hop, if it's something that gets in your ear and it's good, that's what matters."

Biography
Hargrove was born in Waco, Texas, to Roy Allan Hargrove and Jacklyn Hargrove. When he was 9, his family moved to Dallas, Texas. He took lessons at school initially on cornet before turning to trumpet. He was discovered by Wynton Marsalis when Marsalis visited the Booker T. Washington High School for the Performing and Visual Arts in Dallas. One of his most profound early influences was a visit to his junior high school by saxophonist David "Fathead" Newman, who performed as a sideman in Ray Charles's Band. Hargrove's junior high music teacher, Dean Hill, whom Hargrove called his “musical father,” taught him to improvise and solo. Hargrove credited trumpeter Freddie Hubbard as having the greatest influence on his sound.

Hargrove spent a year (1988–1989) studying at Boston's Berklee College of Music but could more often be found playing in New York City jam sessions. He transferred to the New School in New York. His first studio recording there was with saxophonist Bobby Watson for Watson's album No Question About It. Shortly thereafter,  Hargrove recorded with the band Superblue featuring Watson, Mulgrew Miller, Frank Lacy, Don Sickler and Kenny Washington.

In 1990, Hargrove released his debut solo album, Diamond in the Rough, on the Novus/RCA label. This album, and the three succeeding recordings Hargrove made for Novus with his quintet, were among the most commercially successful jazz recordings of the early 1990s and made him one of jazz's in-demand players.

As a side project to his solo and quintet recordings, Hargrove also was the leader of The Jazz Networks, an ensemble of American and Japanese musicians which released 5 albums between 1992 and 1996 and featured other notable jazz artists, including Antonio Hart, Rodney Whitaker and Joshua Redman. (These albums were originally released only in Japan and Europe, but after Hargrove's death, his estate arranged for release on streaming platforms in the U.S.)

Hargrove topped the category "Rising Star–Trumpet" in the DownBeat Critics Poll in 1991, 1992 and 1993. During this time in his early career, Hargrove was known as one of the “Young Lions,” a group of rising jazz musicians — including, among others, Marcus Roberts, Mark Whitfield and Christian McBride — who, embracing the foundations of jazz, played principally bebop, hard bop and the Great American Songbook standards. Hargrove, along with other of the "Young Lions," formed an all-star band in 1991 called The Jazz Futures, which released one critically acclaimed album Live in Concert before going their separate ways.

In 1993, the Lincoln Center Jazz Orchestra commissioned Hargrove to compose an original jazz suite, and he premiered  The Love Suite: In Mahogany at Lincoln Center with his sextet that year.

In 1994, Hargrove moved to Verve and recorded With the Tenors of Our Time, with Joe Henderson, Stanley Turrentine, Johnny Griffin, Joshua Redman, and Branford Marsalis. He followed with Family in 1995, and then experimented with a trio format that same year on the album Parker's Mood, with bassist Christian McBride and pianist Stephen Scott. The Penguin Jazz Guide identifies Parker's Mood as one of the “1001 Best Albums” in the history of the genre.

In 1995, Hargrove first assembled the Roy Hargrove Big Band to perform at the Panasonic Jazz Festival in New York. The band would go on to perform worldwide and feature big band arrangements of Hargrove's own compositions as well as his favorite songs by respected contemporaries.

Hargrove won the Grammy Award for Best Latin Jazz Album in 1998 for Habana with Crisol, an Afro-Cuban band that he founded. He won his second Grammy for Best Jazz Instrumental Album in 2002 for Directions in Music: Live at Massey Hall with co-leaders Herbie Hancock and Michael Brecker. Hargrove was nominated for four other Grammy Awards during his career.

During the late 1990s and early 2000s, Hargrove was also a member of the Soulquarians, a collective of experimental jazz, hip hop and soul artists that included Questlove, D’Angelo, Common and others.

In 2000, Hargrove added jazz and funk-influenced horns in support of D'Angelo on his Grammy-winning album  Voodoo. Hargrove also performed the music of Louis Armstrong in Roz Nixon's musical production "Dedicated To Louis Armstrong" as part of the Verizon Jazz Festival. In 2002, he collaborated with D'Angelo and Macy Gray, the Soultronics, and Nile Rodgers, on two tracks for Red Hot & Riot, a compilation album in tribute to the music of afrobeat pioneer Fela Kuti. He acted as sideman for jazz pianist Shirley Horn and spoken-word artist Common on the album Like Water for Chocolate and in 2002 with singer Erykah Badu on Worldwide Underground.

From 2003 to 2006, Hargrove released three albums as the leader of The RH Factor, a group that blended jazz, soul, hip hop and funk idioms. The band's second album, "Strength," was nominated for a Grammy Award for "Best Contemporary Jazz Album."

After signing with Universal/EmArcy in 2008, Hargrove released a quintet album, "Earfood," which Jazziz selected as one of the 5 “essential albums” of that year. He then followed in 2009 with "Emergence," recorded with the Roy Hargrove Big Band; he received a Grammy nomination for "Best Improvised Jazz Solo" for his performance on the track "Ms. Garvey, Ms. Garvey" on that album.  From 2009 until his death in 2018, Hargrove appeared as a sideman on recordings by Jimmy Cobb, Roy Haynes, Cyrille Aimée, The 1975, D’Angelo and others.

Hargrove won the trumpet category in the 2019 DownBeat Readers’ Poll.

In addition to the accolades he garnered on trumpet, music critics also praised Hargrove's tone on flugelhorn and gifted ways with a ballad. As the Chicago Tribune observed in 2010, "it's Hargrove's ballad playing that tends to win hearts, which is what happened every time he picked up his flugelhorn. We've been hearing Hargrove spin silk on this instrument for a couple of decades now, yet one still marvels at the poetry of his tone, the incredible slowness of his vibrato and the arching lyricism of his phrases."

Over his 30-year career, Hargrove composed and recorded several original compositions, one of which, "Strasbourg-St. Denis", has been characterized as reaching the status of a jazz standard.

In July 2021, nearly three years after his death, Hargrove's estate released via Resonance Records the double-album In Harmony, a live duet recording made in 2006 and 2007 with pianist Mulgrew Miller. Slate selected In Harmony as one of the best jazz albums of 2021. The Académie du Jazz awarded In Harmony its prize for "Best Reissue or Best Unpublished" album of 2021.

Hargrove was posthumously elected to the DownBeat Magazine "Jazz Hall of Fame" in November 2021.

In June 2022, the documentary Hargrove, filmed during the final year of his life, debuted at the Tribeca Film Festival.  Hargrove's estate issued a statement objecting to the film as not what he had envisioned when agreeing to participate.

Personal life and death
A quiet and retiring person in life, Hargrove struggled with kidney failure. He died at the age of 49 of cardiac arrest brought on by kidney disease on November 2, 2018, while hospitalized in New Jersey. According to his long-time manager, Larry Clothier, Hargrove had been on dialysis for the last 14 years of his life. He is survived by his wife, Aida Brandes-Hargrove, and daughter, Kamala Hargrove, who in 2020 launched the company Roy Hargrove Legacy LLC to preserve and extend his legacy. In 2022, Roy Hargrove Legacy re-launched the Roy Hargrove Big Band, which gives live performances featuring original band members and other musicians who supported Hargrove in his various ensembles.

Discography

As leader/co-leader 
 1989–90: Diamond in the Rough (Novus, 1990)
 1991?: Public Eye (Novus, 1991)
 1991: The Tokyo Sessions with Antonio Hart (Novus, 1922)
 1992?: The Vibe (Novus, 1992)
 1993?: Of Kindred Souls: The Roy Hargrove Quintet Live (Novus, 1993)
 1993–94: Approaching Standards (BMG Music/Jazz Heritage, 1995) – compilation of tracks from 4 albums
 1994: The Roy Hargrove Quintet, With the Tenors of Our Time (Verve, 1994)
 1995: Family (Verve, 1995)
 1995: Parker's Mood with Christian McBride, Stephen Scott (Verve, 1995)
 1997: Roy Hargrove's Crisol, Habana (Verve, 1997) – Latin Jazz Grammy Winner
 1999: Roy Hargrove with Strings, Moment to Moment (Verve, 2000)
 2001: Directions in Music: Live at Massey Hall with Herbie Hancock, Michael Brecker (Verve, 2002) – live. Grammy Award for Best Jazz Instrumental Album, Individual or Group of 2003.
 2003?: The RH Factor, Hard Groove (Verve, 2003)
 2003–04?: The RH Factor, Strength EP (Verve, 2004) – includes unreleased Hard Groove (2003) sessions
 2005?: Nothing Serious (Verve, 2006) – promo version released in 2005
 2006?: The RH Factor, Distractions (Verve, 2006)
 2007: The Roy Hargrove Quintet, Earfood (EmArcy, 2008)
 2008: The Roy Hargrove Big Band, Emergence (Universal/Emarcy, 2009)

Posthumous release
 In Harmony with Mulgrew Miller (Resonance, 2021) – recorded in 2006-07

As member 
Superblue
 1988: Superblue (Somethin' Else [JP]; Blue Note, 1988)

Manhattan Projects
With Carl Allen, Donald Brown, Ira Coleman and Kenny Garrett
 1989: Dreamboat (Timeless, 1990)
 1989: Piccadilly Square (Timeless, 1993)

Jazz Futures
With Antonio Hart, Benny Green, Carl Allen, Christian McBride, Mark Whitfield, Marlon Jordan, Tim Warfield
 1991: Live in Concert (Novus [US], 1993)

The Jazz Networks
 1991: Straight to the Standards (Novus J/BMG Japan, 1992)
 1992: Beauty and the Beast (Novus [US]; Novus J/BMG Japan, 1993)
 1993: Blues 'n Ballads  (Novus J/BMG Japan, 1994)
 1993–94: The Other Day (Novus J/BMG Japan, 1996)
 1994: In the Movies (Novus J/BMG Japan, 1995)

As sideman 

With D'Angelo
 1998–99: Voodoo (Virgin, 2000)
 2002–14: Black Messiah (RCA, 2014)

With Erykah Badu
 1998–2000: Mama's Gun (Motown, 2000)
 2001–03: Worldwide Underground (Motown, 2003)

With Jimmy Cobb
 2006: Cobb's Corner (Chesky, 2007)
 2008: Jazz in the Key of Blue (Chesky, 2009)
 2016: Remembering U (Jimmy Cobb World, 2019) – posthumous release

With Johnny Griffin
 1994?: Chicago-New york-Paris (Verve, 1994)
 2008: Live at Ronnie Scott's (In+Out, 2008) – live

With Roy Haynes
 Birds of a Feather: A Tribute to Charlie Parker (Dreyfus Jazz, 2001)
 Roy-Alty (Dreyfus Jazz, 2011)

With Shirley Horn
 1995: The Main Ingredient (Verve, 1996)
 1997: I Remember Miles (Verve, 1998)
 2003: May the Music Never End (Verve, 2003)

With Jimmy Smith
 1995: Damn! (Verve, 1995)
 1995: Angel Eyes: Ballads & Slow Jams (Verve, 1996)

With The 1975
 2015: I Like It When You Sleep, for You Are So Beautiful yet So Unaware of It (Dirty Hit, 2016)
 2017-18: A Brief Inquiry into Online Relationships (Dirty Hit, 2018)
 2018-20: Notes on a Conditional Form (Dirty Hit, 2020) – posthumous release

With others
 1988: Bobby Watson & Horizon, No question about it (Blue Note, 1988)
 1989: Ricky Ford, Hard Groovin' (Muse, 1989)
 1990: Ralph Moore, Furthermore (Landmark, 1990)
 1990: Frank Morgan, A Lovesome Thing (Antilles, 1991)
 1991?: Antonio Hart, For the First Time (Novus, 1991)
 1991?: Charles Fambrough, The Proper Angle (CTI, 1991)
 1991: Sonny Rollins, Here's to the People (Milestone, 1991) – 2 tracks "I Wish I Knew" and "Young Roy"
 1992?: Jackie McLean, Rhythm of the Earth (Birdology, 1992)
 1992?: V.A., New York Stories (Blue Note, 1992)
 1992: Philip Bailey, Billy Childs, Bobby Watson, Tony Williams, "Pride of Lions" (Sony Masterworks, 1992)
 1992: Diana Ross, Stolen Moments: The Lady Sings... Jazz and Blues (Motown, 1993) – live
 1993: Bob Thiele Collective, Lion Hearted (Red Baron, 1993)
 1993: Steve Coleman, The Tao of Mad Phat (Novus, 1993)
 1993: Rodney Kendrick, The Secrets of Rodney Kendrick (Verve, 1993)
 1994: David Sanchez, Sketches of Dreams (Columbia, 1995)
 1994: Marc Cary, Cary On (Enja, 1995)
 1994: Christian McBride, Gettin' to It (Verve, 1995)
 1996: Cedar Walton, Composer (Astor Place, 1996)
 1996: Oscar Peterson, Meets Roy Hargrove and Ralph Moore (Telarc, 1996)
 1997?: Kitty Margolis, Straight up with a Twist (Mad-Kat, 1997)
 1997: Fred Sanders, East of Vilbig (Leaning House Jazz, 1997)
 1999–2000: Common, Like Water for Chocolate (MCA, 2000)
 2000: Ray Brown Trio, Some of My Best Friends Are... The Trumpet Players (Telarc, 2000)
 2001?: Boz Scaggs, Dig (Virgin, 2001)
 2002: Natalie Cole, Ask a Woman Who Knows (Verve, 2002) – 1 track "I'm Glad There Is You"
 2003?: Randal Corsen, Armonia (AJA, 2003)
 2005: Anke Helfrich, Better Times Ahead (Double Moon, 2006)
 2005: Steve Davis, Update (Criss Cross Jazz, 2006)
 2006: John Mayer, Continuum (Aware, 2006)
 2008?: John Beasley, Letter to Herbie (Resonance, 2008)
 2008?: Roy Assaf & Eddy Khaimovich Quartet, Andarta (Origin, 2008)
 2008: Marcus Miller, A Night in Monte Carlo (Dreyfus/Concord Jazz, 2010) – live
 2010?: Angelique Kidjo, Õÿö (Razor & Tie, 2010) – 1 track  "Samba pa ti"
 2010: Cyrille Aimée + Friends, Live at Smalls (SmallsLIVE, 2011) – live
 2011: Laïka Fatien, Come A Little Closer (Universal Music, 2012)
 2011?: Stan Killian, Unified (Sunnyside, 2011)
 2003–11: Jim Martinez and Friends, He Keeps Me Swinging - Jazz Praise IV (Invisible Touch, 2011)
 2015?: Ameen Saleem, The Grove Lab (Jando Music S.r.l., 2015)
 2017: Johnny O'Neal, In The Moment (Smoke Sessions, 2017)
 2018?: Kandace Springs, Indigo (Blue Note, 2018) – 1 track "Unsophisticated"

References

External links

Roy Hargrove at Emarcy Records.
Roy Hargrove at Verve Records.
Roy Hargrove at Jazz Trumpet Solos.
Roy Hargrove Quintet: Earfood album review at AllMusic
Hard Groove album review in Vibe magazine.

1969 births
2018 deaths
20th-century African-American people
21st-century African-American people
African-American jazz musicians
American jazz trumpeters
American male jazz musicians
American male trumpeters
Berklee College of Music alumni
Grammy Award winners
Hard bop trumpeters
Jazz musicians from New York (state)
Jazz musicians from Texas
Jazz trumpeters
Latin jazz trumpeters
Mainstream jazz trumpeters
Musicians from Dallas
People from Waco, Texas
Post-bop trumpeters
Soulquarians members
Superblue (band) members
The New School alumni
The Soultronics members
Verve Records artists
WJ3 Records artists